Stiphodon sapphirinus, the sapphire stiphodon, is a species of goby found both the North Province and South Province of New Caledonia and in Vanuatu.
  
This species can reach a length of  SL.

References

sapphirinus
Taxa named by Ronald E. Watson
Taxa named by Philippe Keith
Taxa named by Gérard Marquet
Fish described in 2005
Fauna of Vanuatu
Fish of New Caledonia